is a junction passenger railway station located in the city of Ono, Hyōgo Prefecture, Japan. It is operated jointly by the West Japan Railway Company (JR West), the third sector  and the private Kobe Electric Railway (Shintetsu).

Lines
It is also the terminal station of the 13.7 kilometer Hōjō Railway Hōjō Line and the 29.2 kilometer Ao Line

Station layout
The station consists of a ground-level side platform, island platform and bay platform all connected by a footbridge. The station is unattended.

Platforms

Adjacent stations

|-
!colspan=5|West Japan Railway Company (JR West)

|-
!colspan=5|Hōjō Railway

|-
!colspan=5|Kobe Electric Railway

History
Ao Station opened on August 10, 1913. With the privatization of the Japan National Railways (JNR) on April 1, 1987, the station came under the aegis of the West Japan Railway Company.

Passenger statistics
In fiscal 2019, the JR portion of the station was used by an average of 1038 passengers daily and the Shintetsu portion of the station was used by 859 passengers daily.

Surrounding area
 Ono Station Park
Awao Children's Garden

See also
List of railway stations in Japan

References

External links

 Official website (JR West)
 Official website (Hōjō Railway) 
 Official website (Kobe Electric Railway) 

Railway stations in Japan opened in 1913
Railway stations in Hyōgo Prefecture
Ono, Hyōgo